Johnson County is a county located in the U.S. state of Indiana.  As of 2020, the population was 161,765.  The county seat is Franklin.

Johnson County is included in the Indianapolis-Carmel-Anderson, IN Metropolitan Statistical Area.

Transportation

Major highways
  Interstate 65

  U.S. Route 31
  State Road 37
  State Road 44
  State Road 135
  State Road 144
  State Road 252

Airport
 KHFY - Greenwood Municipal Airport
 3FK - Franklin Flying Field

Geography

Adjacent counties
 Marion County  (north)
 Shelby County  (east)
 Bartholomew County  (southeast)
 Brown County (southwest)
 Morgan County (west)

History
Johnson County was formed in 1823. It was named for John Johnson, a Justice of the Indiana Supreme Court. This is probably John Johnson of Knox County, delegate to the State constitutional convention, appointed to the Supreme Court in 1816.

Cities and towns
 Bargersville
 Edinburgh
 Franklin
 Greenwood
 New Whiteland
 Princes Lakes
 Trafalgar
 Whiteland

Extinct
 Farwest

Townships
 Blue River
 Clark
 Franklin-Union-Needham, which merged in January 2022
 Hensley
 Nineveh
 Pleasant
 White River

The south end of the county is also home to the Camp Atterbury military installation.

Climate and weather 

The coldest temperature ever recorded in Indiana was in the town of New Whiteland, Indiana, on January 19, 1994, when the temperature reached .

Government

The county government is a constitutional body, and is granted specific powers by the Constitution of Indiana, and by the Indiana Code.

County Council: The county council is the legislative branch of the county government and controls all the spending and revenue collection in the county. Representatives are elected from county districts. The council members serve four-year terms. They are responsible for setting salaries, the annual budget, and special spending. The council also has limited authority to impose local taxes, in the form of an income and property tax that is subject to state level approval, excise taxes, and service taxes.

Board of Commissioners: The executive body of the county is made of a board of commissioners. The commissioners are elected county-wide, in staggered terms, and each serves a four-year term. One of the commissioners, typically the most senior, serves as president. The commissioners are charged with executing the acts legislated by the council, collecting revenue, and managing the day-to-day functions of the county government.

Courts: The county maintains a Circuit Court can handle all types of cases, unless a particular case type is specifically reserved to another court. The county also maintains three Superior Courts that also handle all types of cases, and also handle the small claims and juvenile cases. The judges on each of the courts is elected to a term of four years and must be a member of the Indiana Bar Association.

County Officials: The county has several other elected offices that are mandated by the Indiana Constitution. These include sheriff, coroner, assessor, auditor, recorder, surveyor, and circuit court clerk Each of these elected officers serves terms of four years and oversee different parts of the county government. Members elected to county government positions are required to declare party affiliations and to be residents of the county.

Johnson County is part of Indiana's Indiana's 9th congressional district; Indiana Senate districts 36, 37, and 41; and Indiana House of Representatives districts 47, 58, 65, and 93.

Demographics

As of the 2010 United States Census, there were 139,654 people, 52,242 households, and 37,711 families residing in the county. The racial makeup of the county was 93.9% white, 2.0% Asian, 1.1% black or African American, 0.2% American Indian, 1.2% from other races, and 1.5% from two or more races. Those of Hispanic or Latino origin made up 3.1% of the population. In terms of ancestry, 28.1% were German, 15.7% were Irish, 11.5% were English, and 10.3% were American.

Of the 52,242 households, 37.1% had children under the age of 18 living with them, 57.3% were married couples living together, 10.2% had a female householder with no husband present, 27.8% were non-families, and 22.6% of all households were made up of individuals. The average household size was 2.63 and the average family size was 3.09. The median age was 36.8 years.

The median income for a household in the county was $47,697 and the median income for a family was $72,723. Males had a median income of $52,107 versus $36,029 for females. The per capita income for the county was $28,224. About 5.9% of families and 8.1% of the population were below the poverty line, including 11.1% of those under age 18 and 4.8% of those age 65 or over.

See also
 Daily Journal - local daily newspaper
 National Register of Historic Places listings in Johnson County, Indiana

References

External links

 Delegates to the 1816 Constitutional Convention
 Johnson County Government site

 
Indiana counties
1823 establishments in Indiana
Populated places established in 1823
Indianapolis metropolitan area